Richard McKenzie (born June 2, 1930) is an American character actor who is known for his guest role as Fred Bunker, younger brother of Archie Bunker on the hit CBS-TV sitcom series All in the Family in seasons 7 and 8, and season 4 of Archie Bunker's Place. He also appeared in other popular shows such as Quincy, M.E., Hawaii Five-O, Matlock and In the Heat of the Night.

Biography and career

McKenzie's career began in television in a 1961 episode of the sitcom My Three Sons as Quinn. It would be another 14 years until Richard would make another television guest star appearance on the TV drama Doctors' Hospital in 1975 as Dr. Williams.

Throughout the 1970s, McKenzie would make guest appearances on many television shows. His most famous guest appearances on the 70's were on the television sitcoms Three's Company in 1978 as Chef Anton, All in the Family in two episodes between 1978 and 1979 as Archie Bunker's younger brother Alfred "Fred" Bunker, (he would later revise this role on an episode of All in the Family ' s spinoff sitcom Archie Bunker's Place in 1982), and on two episodes of Carter County between 1978 and 1979 as Dr. Fenway. Throughout the 1970s,  McKenzie would guest star in such as The Waltons, Hawaii Five-O, The Jeffersons, Roots, Sword of Justice, One Day at a Time, etc.

McKenzie would also have an extraordinary television career in the 1980s which also included two co-starring role in television shows. His first guest starring role was in the show Family in three different episodes as two different characters. His first co-starring role was in the 1980s short-lived series The Yeagers. The Yeagers was a drama centering on the life of the Yeager family and associates. The series produced only one episode in 1980. The series also co-starred David Ackroyd, Guy Boyd, and Andy Griffith. In 1982, McKenzie would again co-star in another short-lived series entitled It Takes Two. The series was about a couple, Sam and Molly Quinn who are too focused on their jobs to pay attention to their children or each other. He played Walter Chaiken in the series. The series aired for twenty-two episodes in one season, (1982–1983). The series also co-starred Richard Crenna, Patty Duke, and Helen Hunt. Some other of his memorable guest star roles in the 1980s include those in the shows Soap, CBS Afternoon Playhouse, Archie Bunker's Place, Knots Landing, Benson, Growing Pains, Too Close for Comfort, Matlock, ALF, etc.

In the 1990s, McKenzie would guest star on shows such as The Golden Girls, The Fresh Prince of Bel-Air, NYPD Blue, In the Heat of the Night, etc. His last appearance on television was in a 2002 episode of Judging Amy as Judge Novak.

He also appeared in many movies and TV movies. He starred in more than 10 movies during the course of 22 years. His first movie role as "Behan" in the 1971 movie Doc. Some of his other memorable appearances in the movies included those in A.W.O.L. (1972), Man on a Swing, (1974), Corvette Summer, (1978), Being There, (1979), The Doctor, (1991), and Ghost in the Machine (1993). He also appeared in more than 20 TV movies. His first role was in Nicky's World, (1974), as the role of Mr. Lanning, and his last role was in Deadly Medicine, (1991), as the role of Brookshire.

McKenzie made his name in theater as well. His Broadway credits included That Championship Season, Uncle Vanya and many more.

Filmography

Film

Television

References

Further reading
Patty Duke, Just Call Me Anna, Autobiography of Patty Duke (Random House LLC, Apr 13, 2011)

External links

Male actors from Tennessee
American male stage actors
American male television actors
American male film actors
People from Chattanooga, Tennessee
1930 births
Living people